Alexandre Rodrigues (born 1983 in Rio de Janeiro) is a Brazilian actor. He is most famous for playing the part of Buscapé (Rocket in the English subtitled version), the narrator and protagonist in the 2002 film Cidade de Deus (City of God). He has most recently appeared in American singer John Legend's music video for the song "P.D.A. (We Just Don't Care)" released in 2007. In 2018, it was revealed that Rodrigues had started driving for Uber, which prompted discussions about economic mobility and equality of opportunity in Brazil.

Roles

Television

2003 - Cidade dos Homens - Alex
2004 - Cabocla - Zaqueu
2006 - Sinhá Moça - Bentinho

Cinema
2002 - Palace II - Vapor
2002 - Cidade de Deus - Buscapé
2005 - Cafundó - Natalino (adult)
2006 - Memórias da Chibata - João Cândido
2007 - Forbidden to Forbid - Leon

References

External links

1983 births
Living people
Brazilian male film actors
Male actors from Rio de Janeiro (city)
Afro-Brazilian male actors